Stephen Hills (born 15 December 1981) is a New Zealand cyclist. He competed at the 2016 and 2020 Summer Paralympics. He was a bronze medallist at the 2019 UCI Para-cycling Road World Championships in the  Netherlands.

References

External links 
 
 

1981 births
Living people
New Zealand male cyclists
Paralympic cyclists of New Zealand
Cyclists at the 2016 Summer Paralympics
Cyclists at the 2020 Summer Paralympics
21st-century New Zealand people